Larry Lake is the name of:

Larry Lake (engineer), American petroleum engineer
Larry Lake (musician) (1943–2013), Canadian composer, trumpeter, radio broadcaster, and record producer